The 2010 IIHF World Championship Division I was an international ice hockey tournament run by the International Ice Hockey Federation. The tournament was contested from 17 to 25 April 2010. Participants in this tournament were separated into two separate tournament groups. The Group A tournament was contested in Tilburg, Netherlands. Group B's games were played in Ljubljana, Slovenia. Austria won the Group A tournament while Slovenia won the Group B tournament to earn promotion to the Top Division of the 2011 IIHF World Championship.  Serbia and Croatia finished last in each group and will be relegated to Division II at the 2011 World Championships.  Spain and Estonia earned promotion from the 2010 IIHF World Championship Division II and replaced Serbia and Croatia in Division I in 2011.

Participants

Group A

Group B

Group A tournament

Standings

Tournament Awards
 Best players selected by the directorate
Best Goalkeeper: Yutaka Fukufuji 
Best Forward: Kostiantyn Kasianchuk 
Best Defenseman: Matthias Trattnig

Fixtures
All times local.

Scoring leaders
List shows the top skaters sorted by points, then goals.

GP = Games played; G = Goals; A = Assists; Pts = Points; +/− = Plus/minus; PIM = Penalties in minutes; POS = PositionSource: IIHF.com

Leading goalkeepers
Only the top five goalkeepers, based on save percentage, who have played 40% of their team's minutes are included in this list.
TOI = Time on ice (minutes:seconds); SA = Shots against; GA = Goals against; GAA = Goals against average; Sv% = Save percentage; SO = ShutoutsSource: IIHF.com

Group B tournament

Standings

Tournament Awards
 Best players selected by the directorate
Best Goalkeeper: Stephen Murphy 
Best Forward: Žiga Jeglič 
Best Defenseman: András Horváth

Fixtures
All times local.

Scoring leaders
List shows the top skaters sorted by points, then goals.

GP = Games played; G = Goals; A = Assists; Pts = Points; +/− = Plus/minus; PIM = Penalties in minutes; POS = PositionSource: IIHF.com

Leading goalkeepers
Only the top five goalkeepers, based on save percentage, who have played 40% of their team's minutes are included in this list.
TOI = Time on ice (minutes:seconds); SA = Shots against; GA = Goals against; GAA = Goals against average; Sv% = Save percentage; SO = ShutoutsSource: IIHF.com

IIHF Broadcasting rights

References

External links

IIHF World Championship Division I
2
World
2010 in Dutch sport
2010
2010